Jesper Juul (18 April 1948 – 25 July 2019) was a Danish family therapist and author of several books on parenting to a general audience. In his book Your Competent Child (1995, in English 2001) he argues that today's families are at an exciting crossroads because the destructive values — obedience, physical and emotional violence, and conformity — that governed traditional hierarchical families are being transformed. The book has been translated into 13 languages and has popularized current ideas of non-authoritarian parenting.

Biography 
Jesper Juul was born in Vordingborg, Denmark. He had several jobs before entering higher education at Marselisborg Seminarium where he graduated as a teacher of history and religion in 1970. He then enrolled in studies of the history of ideas at the University of Aarhus. He financed his studies working at the resort Bøgholt in Viby J, and dropped out of studies to work full-time with social treatment. At an internal course he became acquainted with U.S. psychiatrist Walter Kempler and they became friends, finally leading to him forming the Kempler Institute of Scandinavia in 1979 with Kempler as a director. A few years later Juul had to take over leadership of the institute and would hold this position until 2004. He has no peer-reviewed scientific articles listed in the American psychological database PsycINFO, however his books have been cited numerous times in academic publications.

Juul's first marriage, which lasted from 1971 to 1990, produced one child. His second marriage ended in divorce in 2014.

Juul died in his home in Odder on 25 July 2019 as a result of a lung infection.

Bibliography (published in English)

References

External links 
Jesper Juul - official website
Kempler Institute

1948 births
2019 deaths
Family therapists
Danish male non-fiction writers
Danish family and parenting writers
Deaths from pneumonia in Denmark
People from Vordingborg Municipality
20th-century Danish male writers
20th-century Danish non-fiction writers
21st-century Danish male writers
21st-century Danish non-fiction writers